Thomas Cole was an Anglican priest in the eighteenth century. Cole was born in Shropshire and educated at King's College, Cambridge. He held livings at Newton, Wisbech, West Raynham and East Raynham. He was installed as Dean of Norwich in May 1724, and continued until his death on 6 February 1731.

Notes

Alumni of King's College, Cambridge
18th-century English Anglican priests
Deans of Norwich
1731 deaths